Acrosterigma magnum , or the magnum cockle, is a species of bivalve mollusc in the family Cardiidae, the true cockles.

Description
Acrosterigma magnum has a shell reaching a length of 38 – 48 mm.

Distribution
This species is found in Caribbean waters, ranging from the Florida Keys to the Gulf of Mexico and northern Brazil.

References

External links
 WoRMS
 Conchology

Cardiidae
Bivalves described in 1758
Taxa named by Carl Linnaeus